Jorge Humberto Pinto Tavares (born 22 April 1986 in Oeiras, Lisbon District) is a Portuguese former footballer who played as a midfielder.

Career
Tavares played in three clubs in the Lisbon District in his youth, the last being C.F. Os Belenenses. On 22 November 2004, still a junior, he made his debut with the first team, playing 27 minutes in a top division match against Académica de Coimbra, and scoring in a 1–1 away draw.

In the following three seasons, Tavares played with another team in the region, C.D. Olivais e Moscavide, helping to promotion to the second level in his first year but being relegated in his second. After one more season, the 22-year-old moved abroad, signing for FC Gloria Buzău in Romania.

External links

1986 births
Living people
People from Oeiras, Portugal
Portuguese footballers
Association football forwards
Primeira Liga players
Sporting CP footballers
C.F. Os Belenenses players
C.D. Olivais e Moscavide players
Liga I players
Cypriot Second Division players
FC Gloria Buzău players
Ayia Napa FC players
Onisilos Sotira players
Portuguese expatriate footballers
Expatriate footballers in Romania
Expatriate footballers in Cyprus
Portuguese expatriate sportspeople in Romania
Portuguese expatriate sportspeople in Cyprus
Sportspeople from Lisbon District